Frederick David Schaeffer (15 November 1760 – 27 January 1836) was a German-American Lutheran clergyman.

Biography
Frederick David Schaeffer was born at Frankfurt am Main in Hesse, Germany. In 1768 he was sent to the gymnasium in Hanau. When both of his parents died, he left the gymnasium. In 1776 he emigrated with an uncle to the United States, but shortly after their arrival the uncle died, and he was left destitute. After teaching in York County, Pennsylvania, he studied theology with Rev. Jacob Goering (1755–1807). He was licensed by the Pennsylvania Ministerium in 1786 and ordained in the Lutheran ministry during 1788.
Schaeffer became pastor of Lutheran congregations at Carlisle (1786–1790); Germantown (St. Michael's; 1790–1812), and from 1812 to 1834 was the colleague of Rev. Dr. Justus Henry Christian Helmuth in Philadelphia. He received the degree of D.D. in 1813 from the University of Pennsylvania.
In 1834, in consequence of the infirmities of age, he relinquished the ministry, and moved to Frederick, Maryland.

Works
 Antwort auf eine Vertheidigung der Methodisten, a response to the evangelists of the Second Great Awakening (Answer to a defense of the Methodists; Germantown, Pennsylvania, 1806)
 Eine herzliche Anrede (A heartfelt address, 1806)

Family
In 1786, he married Rosina Rosenmiller, who died the year before he did.  They had eight children, four of whom became Lutheran clergymen:  David Frederick, Frederick Christian, Charles Frederick and Frederick Solomon.  The last named died at 25, leaving a son, Charles William, to become a Lutheran clergyman.

See also
David Frederick Schaeffer, son
Frederick Christian Schaeffer, son 
Charles Frederick Schaeffer, son 
Charles Schaeffer, grandson

Notes

References

1760 births
1836 deaths
German emigrants to the United States
19th-century American Lutheran clergy
University of Pennsylvania alumni
Clergy from Frankfurt
18th-century American Lutheran clergy
18th-century Lutheran theologians
19th-century Lutheran theologians